Eiler Rasmussen Eilersen (1 March 1827 – 24 April 1912) was a Danish landscape painter.

Biography
Rasmussen Eilersen was born at Østerby, Faaborg-Midtfyn Municipality, Denmark. 
His father, Rasmus Eilersen (1788-1869), was a farmer and the local parish constable.

Like many future artists, he displayed an early affinity for drawing. Bille-Brahe's son, Christian Bille-Brahe (1819-1899), who would become a government official, was a major patron of Eilersen's work .

He took his first formal lessons in Faaborg then, in 1847, went to Copenhagen to pursue his plans for becoming a landscape painter. The outbreak of the First Schleswig War interrupted his plans, however, when he was drafted into the army. He served for two years, then resumed his studies. He began exhibiting almost immediately, under the name "Rasmussen".

In 1858, after much effort, the Royal Danish Academy of Fine Arts awarded him a travel scholarship. This enabled him and his wife to visit Paris, the Pyrenees and Switzerland. In 1871, he became a member of the Academy. He participated in numerous exhibitions abroad, including the Exposition Universelle (1889).

Personal life
He was married in 1856 to Eleanor Vinning (1825-1899), whom he had met in Faaborg. He died in Copenhagen during 1912.

See also
Cape Eiler Rasmussen

References

External links 

1827 births
1912 deaths
19th-century Danish painters
Danish male painters
Danish landscape painters
People from Faaborg-Midtfyn Municipality
19th-century Danish male artists